Jean-Kevin Duverne (born 12 July 1997) is a French professional footballer who plays as a defender for Ligue 1 club Brest.

Club career
Duverne made his RC Lens first team debut on 5 August 2016 against Tours FC.

International career
Duverne was born in France and is of Haitian descent. On 17 May 2018, he was called up to represent the France national under-20 football team at the 2018 Toulon Tournament.

Career statistics

Club

References

External links
 
 

1997 births
Living people
Footballers from Paris
French sportspeople of Haitian descent
French footballers
Association football defenders
RC Lens players
Stade Brestois 29 players
Ligue 1 players
Ligue 2 players
Championnat National 2 players
Championnat National 3 players